James Wilson Neal (born July 2, 1963) is an American member businessman, politician, and former pastor who served as a member of the Georgia House of Representatives. He represented the 1st and 2nd House District from 2005 through 2013.

Early life and education 
Neal was born in Oak Ridge, Tennessee. He earned a Bachelor of Arts degree from Emannuel Theological Seminary.

Career 
In 1989, Neal was a pastor of Gordon Lake Wesleyan Church until 2009. Neal was also a realtor.

On November 2, 2004, Neal was elected to the Georgia House of Representatives for District 1. On November 7, 2006, as an incumbent, Neal won the election and continued serving District 1. On November 4, 2008, as an incumbent, Neal won the election and continued serving District 1. On November 2, 2010, as an incumbent, Neal won the election and continued serving District 1.

On November 6, 2012, Neal won the election unopposed and became a Republican member of Georgia House of Representatives for District 2.

In November 2013, Neal resigned from the Georgia House of Representatives to accept an appointment by Georgia governor Nathan Deal to be executive director of the state's Office of Transition.

In November 2016, Neal was appointed by Georgia governor to be the Executive Director for the Criminal Justice Coordinating Council.

Personal life 
Neal's wife is Gretchen Neal. They have two children.

See also 
 148th Georgia General Assembly (2005-2006)

References

External links 
 Jay Neal at ballotpedia.org

Living people
Republican Party members of the Georgia House of Representatives
People from LaFayette, Georgia
People from Oak Ridge, Tennessee
21st-century American politicians
1963 births